Franz Van Houtte (14 June 1890 – 28 December 1980) was a Belgian footballer. He played in two matches for the Belgium national football team in 1911.

References

External links
 

1890 births
1980 deaths
Belgian footballers
Belgium international footballers
Association football forwards